The Wild Frontier is a 1947 American Western film directed by Philip Ford and written by Albert DeMond. The film stars Allan Lane, Jack Holt, Eddy Waller, Pierre Watkin, John James and Roy Barcroft. The film was released on October 1, 1947, by Republic Pictures.

Plot

Cast   
Allan Lane as Rocky Lane 
Black Jack as Rocky's Horse Black Jack
Jack Holt as Saddles Barton
Eddy Waller as Nugget Clark
Pierre Watkin as Marshal Frank Lane
John James as Jimmy Lane
Roy Barcroft as Barton's Gunman
Tom London as Patrick MacSween
Sam Flint as Steve Lawson 
Ted Mapes as Henchman
Budd Buster as Sam Wheeler
Wheaton Chambers as Doc Hardy

References

External links 
 

1947 films
American Western (genre) films
1947 Western (genre) films
Republic Pictures films
Films directed by Philip Ford
American black-and-white films
1940s English-language films
1940s American films